The 17th Golden Raspberry Awards were held on March 23, 1997, at the Hollywood Roosevelt Hotel to recognise the worst the movie industry had to offer in 1996. Striptease took home the most Razzies of the evening, winning 6 out of 7 nominations, including Worst Picture.

Awards and nominations

Films with multiple nominations 
These films received multiple nominations:

See also

 1996 in film
 69th Academy Awards
 50th British Academy Film Awards
 54th Golden Globe Awards
 3rd Screen Actors Guild Awards

References

 

Golden Raspberry Awards
Golden Raspberry Awards ceremonies
1997 in American cinema
1997 in California
March 1997 events in the United States
Golden Raspberry